Ukrainian Football Amateur League 2001 was the sixth season of the national amateur football competition in Ukraine since their reorganization in 1997.

Overview and format
This season competition consisted of four stages with 35 teams participating. First two stages were organized in regional principal in groups of four or five and were played in two rounds where each team could play another at its home ground. The semifinals and finals, on the other hand, were played in one round. During the season several teams withdrew, while others successfully applied for a professional status.

On the first stage each group winners and their immediate runners-up were to advance to the next part of the competition. Due to few teams joining the professional competition the format was adjusted and to the second stage only eleven teams advanced. The second stage was split in four groups where first two places were advancing to the semifinals. The semifinals, in their turn, were split in two groups where first two teams were advancing to the winners final of four and the last two teams—to the losers final of four. The finals were cut short as Shakhtar Luhansk earned the maximum points after just two games and thus securing the season's title with the.

Note: ZALK stands for the Zaporzhian Aliuminum Plant (Kombinat in Ukrainian).
KZEZO stands for the Kakhovkan Factory (Zavod) of Electro-Welding Equipment (Elektro-Zvariuvalnoho Obladnannia).

Teams

Location map

First stage
Teams that applied to the 2001-02 Second League discontinuing their further participation in the competition: SKA-Orbita Lviv, Stal Dniprodzerzhynsk, and Dnister Ovidiopol.

Group A

Group B

Note: SKA-Orbita Lviv decided to join Druha Liha.Sokil Radyvyliv withdrew.

Group C

Group D

Group E

Note: Stal Dniprodzerzhynsk decided to join Druha Liha.SVKh Danika Simferopol and KDPU Mekhanizator Komyshuvate withdrew. KDPU Mekhanizator Komyshuvate results were annulled.

Group F

Note: Olympik Kharkiv withdrew and its results were annulled.Batkivschyna Kryvyi Rih qualified for the Second Stage, but later withdrew.

Group G

Note: Ekina Almazna withdrew and its results were annulled.

Group H

Second stage

Group 1

Group 2

Note: Yavir VolynLis Tsuman withdrew and its results were annulled.

Group 3

Note: Zemliak Myrhorod replaced Batkivschyna Kryvyi Rih.

Group 4

Note: Tyras-2500 Bilhorod-Dnistrovskyi withdrew.

Semifinals

Group 1

Group 2

Final Group

Note: No further games were necessary as the champion was identified.

A permission to apply for the Second League for the next 2002-03 season was granted to Shakhtar Luhansk, Vuhlyk Dymytrov, and Systema-KKhP Cherniakhiv.

Ukrainian Football Amateur League seasons
Amateur
Amateur